INS Mahish is a  of the Indian Navy.

History
Built at the Gdańsk Shipyard in Poland, INS Mahish was commissioned on 4 June 1985. The ship was decommissioned on 11 November 2016 at Port Blair.  Her last commanding office was Commoder Harkesh Yadav.

References

Kumbhir-class tank landing ships
1985 ships
Ships built in Gdańsk
Naval ships built in Poland for export